Ligon Apartments, also known as Udell Apartments, is a historic apartment building located at Excelsior Springs, Clay County, Missouri. It was built in 1917, and is a 2 1/2-story, red brick colonnade apartment building.  It features a two-story porch with a low pitched hipped roof supported by four square brick columns.  The Ligon Apartments provided residential space for those visiting Excelsior Springs for an extended period of time in order to "take the waters" at the town's multiple mineral springs.

It was listed on the National Register of Historic Places in 2010.

References

Apartment buildings in Missouri
Residential buildings on the National Register of Historic Places in Missouri
Residential buildings completed in 1917
Buildings and structures in Clay County, Missouri
National Register of Historic Places in Clay County, Missouri